The Reissend Nollen is a mountain peak of the Urner Alps, located on the border between the Swiss cantons of Obwalden and Bern. It lies on the range west of the Titlis, between Engelberg and Gadmen.

References

External links
 Reissend Nollen on Hikr

Mountains of the Alps
Mountains of Switzerland
Mountains of the canton of Bern
Alpine three-thousanders
Mountains of Obwalden
Bern–Obwalden border